The Intelligence and Security Committee (ISC) is a statutory select committee of the New Zealand Parliament, currently governed under the Intelligence and Security Act (2017). It is the parliamentary oversight committee that manages New Zealand's intelligence agencies and examines issues relating to their efficacy and efficiency, budgetary matters, and policies.

The ISC consists of the Prime Minister, the Leader of the Opposition, two or three (currently three) further MPs nominated by the Prime Minister, and two further MP nominated by the Leader of the Opposition. The committee meets much more rarely than ordinary Select Committees, however — according to some claims in 2006, for less than an hour each year.

Membership, 53rd Parliament
The following table lists the membership of the committee during the 53rd Parliament:

Notes and references

External links
 

Parliament of New Zealand
New Zealand intelligence agencies